Myers v. Anderson, 238 U.S. 368 (1915), was a United States Supreme Court decision that held Maryland state officials liable for civil damages for enforcing a grandfather clause. Grandfather clauses exempted voters from requirements such as poll taxes and literacy tests if their grandfathers had been registered voters, and were largely designed to exempt white voters from restrictions intended to disenfranchise former black slaves and their descendants. Despite striking down the Maryland law as discriminatory, the court noted that economic discrimination in the form of property requirements should be presumed to be "free from constitutional objection."

Myers was a companion case to Guinn v. United States (1915), which struck down an Oklahoma grandfather clause that effectively exempted white voters from a literacy test, finding it to be discriminatory and a violation of the Fifteenth Amendment to the United States Constitution.

References

External links 

1915 in United States case law
African-American history of Maryland
History of voting rights in the United States
Legal history of Maryland
United States Fifteenth Amendment case law
United States Supreme Court cases
United States Supreme Court cases of the White Court
Maryland elections